Tim Trilk (born August 15, 1998) is an American soccer player who plays as a goalkeeper for Indy Eleven in USL Championship.

College career 
Trilk played four years of college soccer at the University of Western Illinois. He played in 49 games, and had seven saves in 2019 Summit League tournament semifinals.

Club career 
After going undrafted in the 2020 MLS SuperDraft, Trilk signed a contract with Chattanooga Red Wolves SC ahead of the 2020 USL League One season. Trilk re-signed with Chattanooga following the 2020 season.

On July 19, 2021, Trilik was named to the Week 15 USL League One Team of the Week.

On February 16, 2022, Trilk signed with USL Championship side Indy Eleven.

Career statistics

References

External links
 Tim Trilk at USL2

1998 births
Living people
Sportspeople from Rockford, Illinois
American soccer players
Soccer players from Illinois
Association football goalkeepers
Western Illinois Leathernecks men's soccer players
Chattanooga Red Wolves SC players
Indy Eleven players
USL League One players
USL League Two players